Felix Ermacora (13 October 1923 – 24 February 1995) was a leading human rights expert of Austria and a member of the Austrian People's Party.

Biography
In his youth, Ermacora served in the army of Nazi Germany at the rank of private.

He was a professor of international law at the University of Innsbruck from 1956, at the University of Vienna from 1964, member of Parliament for the Austrian People's Party from 1971 to 1990, member of the European Commission of Human Rights and the United Nations Human Rights Committee 1959-1980 and 1984-1987. In 1974 he was President of the United Nations Commission on Human Rights, and from 1984 he was UN Special Rapporteur for Afghanistan. In 1992, he cofounded the Ludwig Boltzmann Institut für Menschenrechte, with his students and close collaborators Manfred Nowak and Hannes Tretter, and served as its first director.

He was part of UN delegations investigating human rights abuses in Chile, South Africa, occupied Palestine, Iran and Afghanistan. On behalf of the Council of Europe, he investigated human rights abuses in Algeria, Greece, Ireland, Turkey and Cyprus. As an academic, a legislator and a UN official, he fought unconditionally against injustice and human rights abuses. In an expert opinion commissioned by the Bavarian government in 1991, Ermacora concluded that the Expulsion of Germans after World War II constituted a genocide and crime against humanity. As the UN Special Rapporteur for Afghanistan, he uncovered "gross violations of human rights" by Soviet forces in Afghanistan, made public in a 1985 report.

He received the German Great Cross of Merit, Commander of the Ordre national du Mérite of France, Commander 1st Class of the Order of the Polar Star of Sweden, the European Charlemagne Award of the Sudetendeutsche Landsmannschaft, the UNESCO Prize for Human Rights Education in 1983 and the European Human Rights Prize of the Council of Europe in 1992 (jointly with Médecins Sans Frontières) for "an exceptional contribution to the cause of human rights". He received honorary doctorates at the universities of Cologne and Strasbourg, and was a corresponding member of the Austrian Academy of Sciences from 1971. He was also a board member of the International Society for Human Rights.

In 1999, the Felix Ermacora Institut was founded, and in 2005, the Felix Ermacora Human Rights Award was established by the Faction of the Conservative Party in the Austrian Parliament. The first prize winners of Felix Ermacora Human Rights Award were the Jesuit priest Georg Sporschill and ORF journalist Friedrich Orter. The Felix Ermacora Society was founded in 2005, and is headed by Wolfgang Schüssel, the former Austrian Chancellor.

His students include Andreas Khol, a former President of the Austrian parliament and, mosts prominently, Manfred Nowak.

He died in 1995, of a disease he caught on a UN mission in Afghanistan and Pakistan in December 1994.

Selected works
 Handbuch der Grundfreiheiten und der Menschenrechte, 1963
 Allgemeine Staatslehre, 2 vol., 1970
 Österreichische Verfassungslehre, 2 vol., 1970/80
 Grundriß der Menschenrechte in Österreich, 1988
 Die Entstehung der Bundesverfassung, 5 vol., 1986–93
 Menschenrechte in der sich wandelnden Welt, 3 vol., 1974–94
 Menschenrechte ohne Wenn und Aber. Erlebnisse und Begegnungen, 1993

Literature
 Manfred Nowak, Dorothea Steurer and Hannes Tretter (eds.), Festschrift für Felix Ermacora - Fortschritt im Bewußtsein der Grund- und Menschenrechte, Kehl am Rhein, Engel, 1988

References

|-

|-

|-

|-

|-

Academic staff of the University of Innsbruck
United Nations Human Rights Committee members
Austrian officials of the United Nations
United Nations special rapporteurs
Politicians from Klagenfurt
Commanders Crosses of the Order of Merit of the Federal Republic of Germany
Commanders of the Ordre national du Mérite
Commanders First Class of the Order of the Polar Star
Austrian People's Party politicians
1923 births
1995 deaths
Austrian human rights activists
Members of the European Commission of Human Rights
Academic staff of the University of Vienna